John Samuel Peters (September 21, 1772 – March 30, 1858) was an American politician, a member of the National Republican and later Whig parties, and the 26th Governor of Connecticut.

Biography
Peters was born in Hebron, Connecticut on September 21, 1772, son of Beneslie and Ann Shipman Peters. He worked on a farm, attended the district schools, taught school in Hebron in 1790, studied medicine under Dr. Benjamin Rush of Marbletown, N.Y., for six months and then under Dr. Abner Mosely of Glastonbury, Conn.; in 1796 attended lectures in Philadelphia, Pa., and practised in Hebron, from 1797 to 1837. He never married.

Career
Peters was town clerk for twenty years, judge of probate for the district of Hebron, and frequently a member of the state legislature. He received the votes of one branch of the state legislature in 1824, when Calvin Willey was elected. In 1810 he was elected to in the Connecticut House of Representatives and was re-elected in 1816 and 1817. He was a member of Connecticut Council of Assistants in 1818. He served in the Connecticut Senate from 1818 to 1823, and was a member of Connecticut House of Representatives from Hebron from 1824 to 1825.

Peters became the 31st Lieutenant Governor of Connecticut in 1827. He became the Governor of Connecticut in March 1831, when Governor Tomlinson resigned from office. He was nominated and elected the Governor of Connecticut later in 1831, and was re-elected to a second term in 1832. During his term, Connecticut's first railroads were authorized and private enterprise was promoted. He also advocated internal and educational improvements, but he was unsuccessful in securing the appropriate funding. He left office in 1833, after an unsuccessful re-election bid.  He was a delegate to the Whig National Convention from Connecticut in 1839, and was the Convention Vice-President.

Death and legacy
Peters died on March 30, 1858 (age 85 years, 190 days). He is interred at St. Peter's Episcopal Cemetery, Hebron, Connecticut. His large stone monument includes a bust of the governor.  He was a fellow of the Tolland County Medical society; treasurer, vice-president and president of the State Medical society, and vice president of the Connecticut Historical Society. He received the honorary degree of M.D. from Yale in 1818, and LL.D. from Trinity in 1831.  He was the nephew of clergyman Samuel Peters and the cousin of Connecticut Supreme Court Justice, John Thompson Peters.

References

External links
 Sobel, Robert and John Raimo. Biographical Directory of the Governors of the United States, 1789–1978. Greenwood Press, 1988. 
Ancestry.com
National Governors Association
The Political Graveyard
Connecticut State Library

1772 births
1858 deaths
Governors of Connecticut
Members of the Connecticut House of Representatives
People from Hebron, Connecticut
Connecticut National Republicans
American people of Dutch descent
National Republican Party state governors of the United States
Connecticut Whigs
19th-century American politicians
Members of the Connecticut General Assembly Council of Assistants (1662–1818)
Lieutenant Governors of Connecticut
Connecticut Democratic-Republicans